WWRA, a.k.a. Radio Amor, is a Spanish language Christian music station aimed at the growing Spanish speaking community around Baton Rouge, Louisiana. The station's initial broadcast license was filed on October 15, 2007, and was granted a Construction permit on December 20, 2007. The station was granted a full non-commercial license on December 11, 2008.

External links
WWRA Radio Amor website
Victory Harvest Church's website

Radio stations in Louisiana
Radio stations established in 2008
Spanish-language radio stations in Louisiana